Hassan Roudbarian (born July 6, 1978 in Qazvin, Iran) is a retired Iranian football goalkeeper.

Club career
He has played most of his career for Pas Tehran. He became well known during Pas's 2003–04 championship season, where he was able to start most of the games, despite competing with former national goalkeeper, Nima Nakisa.

In 2007 after Pas officially dissolved, he joined Iranian giants Persepolis.

Club Career Statistics
Last Update  4 February 2014

International career
He had been called up to the national team many times, during the past few seasons, but received his first international cap for the Iranian national team on March 1, 2006 versus Costa Rica. He was also selected for the final Iran squad that went to Germany for World Cup 2006 where he served as the backup to Ebrahim Mirzapour. He later captured the starting job under new coach Amir Ghalenoei in time for the 2007 AFC Asian Cup.

Honours
Pas Tehran
Iran Pro League: 2003–04
Runner-up: 2002–03, 2005–06

Persepolis
Iran Pro League: 2007–08

Mes Kerman
Hazfi Cup: 2013–14 (Runner-up)

Iran U23 (Wild card)
 Asian Games Bronze Medal: 2006

References

External links
Hassan Roudbarian at TeamMelli.com

Iranian footballers
Iran international footballers
Association football goalkeepers
Persian Gulf Pro League players
Pas players
Paykan F.C. players
Tractor S.C. players
Persepolis F.C. players
Rah Ahan players
Damash Gilan players
2004 AFC Asian Cup players
2006 FIFA World Cup players
2007 AFC Asian Cup players
People from Qazvin
1978 births
Living people
Asian Games bronze medalists for Iran
Asian Games medalists in football
Footballers at the 2006 Asian Games
Medalists at the 2006 Asian Games